Gallardo is a Spanish derivation of the French name "Gaillard" and may refer to:

People 
Notable people with the surname include:
Juan gallardo grimaldo 1738
Almudena Gallardo (born 1979), Spanish archer, Olympic competitor
Ángel Gallardo (civil engineer) (1867–1934), Argentine entomologist and foreign minister
Ángel Gallardo (golfer) (born 1943), Spanish golfer
Carlos Gallardo (actor), Mexican actor, screenwriter, director, and producer
Eva Gallardo (born 1973), Spanish mathematician
Francisco Gallardo, Spanish football player
Gervasio Gallardo, (born 1934), Spanish surrealist painter
Gloria Gallardo (1938–2012), American activist and nun
Gloria Gallardo (politician), Ecuadorian politician and journalist
Gilberto Rincón Gallardo (born 1939), Mexican politician, activist, and former presidential candidate
Helio Gallardo, Chilean-Costa Rican philosopher and professor
Jesús Gallardo (born 1994), Mexican footballer
Joe Gallardo (born 1939), American jazz musician and composer
José Miguel Gallardo (1897–1976), Puerto Rican professor and politician, acting governor of Puerto Rico 1940–1941
Juan Gallardo (born c. 1948), Mexican businessman and financier
Lino Gallardo (1773–1837), Venezuelan musician; involved in Venezuelan independence struggle
Lugiani Gallardo (born 1991), Mexican footballer
Marcelo Gallardo (born 1976), Argentine football player
Matías de Gálvez y Gallardo (1725–1784), Spanish general, governor of Guatemala, viceroy of New Spain
Miguel Gallardo (footballer) (born 1984), Mexican football player
Miguel Gallardo (singer) (1950-2005), Spanish singer
Miguel Ángel Félix Gallardo (born 1946), Mexican drug lord
Miriam Gallardo (born 1968), Peruvian volleyball player 
Ray Gallardo, film director and cinematographer 
Sergio Gallardo (born 1979), Spanish middle-distance runner
Silvana Gallardo (1953-2012), American actress
Steve Gallardo (born 1968), American Democratic politician
Yovani Gallardo (born 1986), baseball player for the Texas Rangers

Fictional characters:
Escobar Gallardo, character on the television show Nip/Tuck

Places 
Los Gallardos, municipality of Almería province, Andalusia, Spain
Dr. Ángel Gallardo Provincial Natural Sciences Museum, museum in Rosario, Argentina

Other uses 
Lamborghini Gallardo, an Italian sports car
17897 Gallardo, a main-belt asteroid discovered on March 19, 1999 by LONEOS
 "Gallardo", a song on the compilation album Self Made Vol. 3
"Gallardo (Runtown song)", 2014

See also 
 Gallardosaurus, a genus of pliosaurid plesiosaur from the Caribbean seaway
 Gallardon (disambiguation)
 Gaillard (disambiguation)
 Galhardo

Spanish-language surnames